Blazing the Western Trail is a 1945 American Western film directed by Vernon Keays and written by J. Benton Cheney. The film stars Charles Starrett, Tex Harding, Dub Taylor, Carole Mathews and Bob Wills. The film was released on September 18, 1945, by Columbia Pictures.

Plot

Cast          
Charles Starrett as Jeff Waring / The Durango Kid
Tex Harding as Tex Harding
Dub Taylor as Cannonball
Carole Mathews as Mary Halliday
Bob Wills as Bob 
Alan Bridge as Forrest Brent
Nolan Leary as Bob Halliday
Virginia Sale as Nellie
Steve Clark as Dan Waring
Mauritz Hugo as Jim McMasters
Ethan Laidlaw as Santry
Edmund Cobb as Sheriff Turner
Frank LaRue as Mr. Spencer
Glenn Strange as Brent
Edward Howard as McMasters
James T. Nelson as Deputy
Budd Buster as Salesman
John Tyrrell as Clerk
Robert B. Williams as Spencer

References

External links
 

1945 films
American Western (genre) films
1945 Western (genre) films
Columbia Pictures films
Films directed by Vernon Keays
American black-and-white films
1940s English-language films
1940s American films